Spook is a nickname of:

 Thomas Dowler (1903-1986), American football, basketball and baseball player and football and basketball coach
 Rupert Hanley (born 1952), South African cricketer
 Spook Jacobs (1925–2011), American Major League Baseball player
 Billy J. Murphy (1921-2008), head football coach at the University of Memphis from 1958 to 1971

Robert "Spook" Yaros-  American rock drummer
Lists of people by nickname